Pontederia cordata, common name pickerelweed (USA) or pickerel weed (UK), is a monocotyledonous aquatic plant native to the American continents. It grows in a variety of wetlands, including pond and lake margins across an extremely large range from eastern Canada south to Argentina. A few examples include northern rivers, the Everglades and Louisiana.

Ecology
The species grows as an emergent plant, that is, in flooded conditions, so the plant is generally dependent upon aerenchyma in the stem to carry oxygen into the roots. Its metabolism, is, however, also tolerant of low soil oxygen. It is often found in areas where water levels fluctuate naturally, with spring flooding and later summer emergence. Apart from flooding, the species is also influenced by soil fertility, tending to grow in the more fertile bays of large lakes, for example. Like many aquatic plants, it is negatively affected by salinity and grazing. It is also negatively affected by competition from other wetland plants. Like many wetland plants, it can survive unfavorable conditions as buried seeds in the soil.

Flowers
The plant flowers in late summer.  The purple flowers have yellow markings which may assist in attracting bees for pollination.  Two species known to pollinate the flowers are Melissodes apicatus and Dufourea novaeangliae.
Once the plant begins to produce seeds, the stem supporting the inflorescence bends to submerge the fruits and seeds. Seeds are dormant at the time of dispersal and will not germinate without stratification for 6–8 weeks.

The flowers of the species are tristylous, meaning the styles of individual plants occur in three different morphs, with most populations containing all three. Leaf shape, which varies considerably across populations, within populations, and even within individuals, has been the source for many taxonomic synonyms. Like many wetland and aquatic plants, the species can reproduce asexually by means of branching rhizomes, and hence can form large clonal stands.

Cultivation
This plant is cultivated as an ornamental garden pond plant, and has gained the Royal Horticultural Society's Award of Garden Merit.

Uses
The young leafstalks can be eaten raw (with the unripe fruits stripped off) or cooked. The seeds are edible raw, and can be ground into grain.

References

External links

PLANTS Profile for Pontederia cordata
Pontederia cordata, Natural Resources Canada
Pontederia cordata Flowers in Israel

Aquatic plants
Pontederiaceae
Edible plants
Flora of North America
Flora of South America
Plants described in 1753
Taxa named by Carl Linnaeus